Temporary duty travel (TDY), also known as  temporary additional duty (TAD), is a designation reflecting a United States Armed Forces service member's—or civilian Department of Defense employee's—travel or other assignment at a location other than the traveler's permanent duty station as authorized by the Joint Travel Regulations. This type of secondment is usually of relatively short duration, typically from two to 189 days in length. Not all agencies use this designation.

Temporary duty assignments usually come with per diem pay, covering lodging, meals, and incidental expenses. Many employees value the per diem aspect of a TDY, since that money is guaranteed, even if they spend less than their allotted daily value. However, most agencies handle the lodging per diem separately from the meals and incidentals, and employees may not make money by staying at cheaper accommodations, or putting more than one person in a room.

Typically, an employee may request a cash advance of 60–80% of the total value of the first 30 days of meals and incidental expenses before the TDY per diem takes place, in order to prevent the employee from having to use his or her own money, or putting money on a personal credit card. Government travel cards are also typically available, though these sometimes carry restrictions on the types of goods or services that can be purchased with them.

Some locations have furnished apartments for long-term stay. These apartments have fully equipped kitchens so TDY recipients have the option to cook rather than always eat out, and some may have free washing machines and clothes dryers. Some government agencies consider any assignment over 45 days as an extended TDA, which allows the employee to be reimbursed for part of the expenses before the end of the assignment.

Examples of TDY assignments in the United States Army include attendance of newly-commissioned officers at basic-branch Basic Officer Leaders Courses, and Gold Bar Recruiter duty in the interim; and training of all ranks at specialty-skill schools (e.g. United States Army Airborne School, United States Army Air Assault School, Army Mountain Warfare School) through their sponsoring commands. In the United States Air Force, temporary duty can be commonly approved by commanders for service at Civil Air Patrol basic encampments or other activities because it serves the organizational mission of recruitment and public affairs.

References

External links
 GSA 2011 Per Diem Rates CONUS & OCONUS

Federal government of the United States
Military slang and jargon